Edward Weston (1886–1958) was an American photographer and co-founder of Group f/64.

Edward Weston may also refer to:
 Edward Weston (priest) (1566–1635), English Roman Catholic controversialist
 Edward Weston (politician) (1703–1770), English didactic writer and politician
 Edward Weston (chemist) (1850–1936), English chemist who migrated to Newark, New Jersey and developed electroplating
 Edward Faraday Weston (1878–1971), his son, designer of the Weston exposure meter which established the Weston film speed ratings
 Edward Payson Weston (1839–1929), pedestrian
 Edward Weston (pastoralist), former officer of the East India Company who arrived in Australia in 1825
 Edward Weston (archer) (1846–1918), American archer
 Professor Weston (Edward Rolles Weston), a character created by C. S. Lewis